Ed Pimm (born May 3, 1956 in Rock Tavern, New York), is a former driver in the CART Championship Car series.

He raced in the 1984–1988 seasons, with 42 career starts, including the 1985–1987 Indianapolis 500s. He drove two CART events for Gary Trout Motorsports finishing 12th at Mid-Ohio and 14th at Elkart Lake. He finished in the top ten 12 times, with his best finish in 3rd position in 1985 at Michigan.  In 1987 and 1988, he also made 5 Winston Cup starts. Earlier in his career, he was the 1983 US Super Vee champion.

Indianapolis 500 results

NASCAR career

In 1987 and 1988, he also made 5 Winston Cup starts. He debuted in 1987, driving for Curb Racing at Talladega. Starting a year-long best 30th, Pimm led one lap and settled for a 27th-place effort after an engine issue. His run earned him two more races for the team, finishing 34th after an engine issue at Daytona and then crashed to 42nd in the season finale at Atlanta Motor Speedway.

Pimm returned to the team in early 1988, running two races. He made the prestigious Daytona 500, starting 40th but ending with a career-best 24th place showing. It was also his only race in Cup competition that he was running at the end. Two weeks later, at Rockingham, Pimm started a career-best 29th before crashing to 34th.

Pimm never returned to NASCAR after that race.

Racing record

SCCA National Championship Runoffs

Complete USAC Mini-Indy Series results

Formula Super Vee

References

External links
NASCAR stats from Racing-Reference.info

1956 births
Champ Car drivers
Atlantic Championship drivers
Indianapolis 500 drivers
Living people
NASCAR drivers
SCCA Formula Super Vee drivers
Formula Super Vee Champions
People from Dublin, Ohio
Racing drivers from Ohio
SCCA National Championship Runoffs participants